Mushkan (also Romanized as Mūshkān and Mooshakan; also known as Mūshgān) is a village in Ahmadabad Rural District, in the Central District of Firuzabad County, Fars Province, Iran. At the 2006 census, its population was 532, in 124 families.

References 

Populated places in Firuzabad County